Sri Widoyati (1929 – 1982) was the first woman appointed as a Judge of the Supreme Court of Indonesia, which occurred in 1968. She was Muslim.

Further reading
Anak dan wanita dalam hukum [Children and women in law], by Sri Widoyati Wiratmo Soekito, Jakarta: Institute for Research, Education and Economic and Social Affairs, 1983
Bibliography of Sri Widoyati Wiratmo Soekito

References

20th-century Indonesian judges
1929 births
1982 deaths
20th-century women judges